Estádio Municipal de Famalicão is a multi-use stadium in Vila Nova de Famalicão, Portugal.  It is currently used mostly for football matches and is the home stadium of FC Famalicão who currently compete in the Primeira Liga, the top tier of Portuguese football. The stadium is able to hold 5,307 people.

The municipality is planning expansion works on the stadium to increase its capacity to 7,500 people and a general improvement on the conditions of the stadium. The works are set to start in early 2020.

References

Municipal 22
Sports venues in Braga District
Sports venues completed in 1952